The Terfeziaceae, or desert truffles, is a family of truffles endemic to arid and semi-arid areas of the Mediterranean Region, North Africa, and the Middle East, where they live in ectomycorrhizal association with Helianthemum species and other ectomycorrhizal plants (including Cistus, oaks, and pines). This group consists of three genera: Terfezia, Tirmania, and Mattirolomyces. They are a few centimetres across and weigh from 30 to 300 grams (1–10 oz). Desert truffles are often used as a culinary ingredient.

Family description
Fruit-bodies (ascomata) are large, more or less spherical to turbinate (top-shaped), thick-walled, and solid. The asci are formed in marbled veins interspersed with sterile tissue. The asci are cylindrical to spherical, indehiscent (not splitting open at maturity), and sometimes stain blue in iodine. Ascospores are hyaline to pale brown, spherical, and uninucleate.

Habitat and ecology
Desert truffles, as the name suggests, predominantly grow in the desert. They have been found in arid and semi-arid zones of the Kalahari desert, the Mediterranean basin, Syria, Azerbaijan, Iran, Iraq, Kuwait, the Negev desert in Israel, the Sahara, Saudi Arabia, Qatar, Libya, Spain, Greece, Cyprus, Hungary, Croatia, and China. They can be formed near Sunrose (Helianthemum) plants, but they are very rare to find and can't be cultivated (thus justifying their cost).

Culinary use and commercial importance
Desert truffles do not have the same flavor as European truffles, but tend to be more common and thus more affordable. Forest truffles (genus Tuber) typically cost $1000 per kilogram, and Italian truffles may sell for up to $2,200 per kilogram, while Terfezia truffles sold as of 2002 in Riyadh for $200 to $305 a kilo, and in recent years have reached, but not yet exceeded, $570. Israeli agricultural scientists have been attempting to domesticate Terfezia boudieri into a commercial crop.

Vernacular names

Desert truffles go by several different names. In Iran they are called Donbalan, In Kurdistan they are called  in Central Anatolia and Kurdistan areas, also Keme on the Syrian-Kurdistan border. In Algeria and Tunisia they are called ; the Bedouin of the Western Desert call them terfas ترفاس. The Kuwaitis call them  , the Saudis  , and in Syria, and in Libya  ; they are known by their classical Arabic name,  . In Botswana they are called mahupu.

In Saudi Arabia, there are two varieties;  are oval with a black skin and a pinkish-ivory interior, and  have a cream colour but are generally more expensive.

In oceanic countries, there is some confusion regarding the desert truffle, as the yam is often referred to as the common desert truffle as well.

Species list
 Terfezia arenaria
 Terfezia boudieri
 Terfezia claveryi
 Terfezia leptoderma
 Terfezia terfezioides – phylogenetic analyses based on nuclear rDNA sequences strongly suggest that this species be reassigned to the original monotypic genus Mattirolomyces.

 Tirmania honrubiae 
 Tirmania nivea 
 Tirmania pinoyi 

 Mattirolomyces austroafricanus 
 Mattirolomyces mexicanus 
 Mattirolomyces mulpu 
 Mattirolomyces spinosus 
 Mattirolomyces terfezioides

References

 Dıéz J, Manjón JL, Martin F. (2002) Molecular phylogeny of the mycorrhizal desert truffles (Terfezia and Tirmania), host specificity and edaphic tolerance. Mycologia 94(2): 247–259.

Pezizaceae
Edible fungi
Ascomycota families